Arbre is a village and district of the municipality of Ath, located in the Hainaut Province in Wallonia, Belgium.

During the Middle Ages the village was a fief; the knight Methieu d'Arbre and his son Hugues distinguished themselves during the Crusades. A castle once existed in the village but only a few traces remains today. The village church was built in 1835, but the tower stems from an earlier building from the 16th century.

References

External links

Populated places in Hainaut (province)